The Tasmanian Film Corporation was a Tasmanian statutory corporation founded 1977 to replace the Tasmanian Government Department of Film Production.

Films
By far its biggest success was Manganinnie, an AFI Award and AWGIE Award winning feature film. Other productions included A Fish For All Seasons (1982), a 10-part miniseries for the Tasmanian Fisheries Development Authority, Impressions of a Colony (1980) for the National Parks and Wildlife Service, Save the Lady (1982) and Helicopter Tasmania (1982) however following a brief period of success it was privatised by Premier Gray in 1983 and shut down progressively over the following decade.

References

Former government-owned companies of Tasmania
Mass media in Tasmania
Film organisations in Australia